Feel Good You is a monthly magazine for women aged over 40 published by IPC Media. It is a spin-off from Woman & Home magazine and is edited by Carrie Taylor.

History
The magazine was launched in 2011 following the launch of Feel Good Food.

See also
 Feel Good Food

References

External links
 

Lifestyle magazines published in the United Kingdom
Monthly magazines published in the United Kingdom
English-language magazines
Magazines established in 2011